Amt Falkenberg-Höhe is an Amt ("collective municipality") in the district of Märkisch-Oderland, in Brandenburg, Germany. Its seat is in Falkenberg.

The Amt Falkenberg-Höhe consists of the following municipalities:
Beiersdorf-Freudenberg
Falkenberg
Heckelberg-Brunow
Höhenland

Demography

References

Falkenberg-Hohe
Märkisch-Oderland